The Eparchy of Križevci is a Greek Catholic Church of Croatia and Serbia eparchy of the Catholic Church in Croatia, Slovenia, and Bosnia and Herzegovina. Its current eparch is Milan Stipić. The cathedra is in the Cathedral of the Holy Trinity, in the episcopal see of Križevci, Croatia.

It mostly gathers its faithful among ethnic Croats in central and eastern Croatia, and among the Ukrainians and Rusyns in eastern Slavonia, with a small Serbian minority. The liturgy used by the Eparchy is the Slavonic form of the Byzantine Rite, using the Old Church Slavonic language and the Cyrillic alphabet.

History

Historical background 

The Ottoman wars in Europe caused a number of Christian refugees, Orthodox Serbs, to migrate to the Military Frontier of the Habsburg monarchy (in south-central Croatia and in most of Slavonia) during the 16th and 17th centuries. In particular after the Ottoman defeat in Battle of Sisak of 1593, the Habsburg tried to established an ecclesiastical jurisdiction in full communion with Rome and separated from the Serbian Orthodox Church. After negotiations, it was decided to establish a particular Byzantine Rite jurisdiction in the form of an apostolic vicariate based in the monastery of Marča (located near Ivanić Grad).

The basis for the creation of Apostolic Vicariate of Marča was formally enabled by Pope Paul V on 21 November 1611 with the decree Divinae Majestatis arbitrio, and the administration of the Vicariate was given to eparchs (bishops) who bore the title Episcopus Platæensis (from Plataea, the titular see they were assigned to), while the Habsburg government called this see Episcopatus Svidnicensis or Episcopatus Maciensum (Eparchy of Marča).  After the death in 1630 of the first eparch (bishop), Simeon Vratanja, and in 1628 of the Latin Bishop of Zagreb, Petar Dimitrović, the eparchy came into conflict with the Latins and in 1671 bishop  accepted for himself and his successors the position of vicar-general of the Latin bishops of Zagreb.

On 17 November 1735, the supporters of the Serbian Orthodox Church occupied by force of arms the monastery of Marča and two years later, on 17 June 1737, set fire to it. The monastery was restored to the Byzantine Rite Catholics in 1753.

Erection of the Eparchy of Križevci 
To support the pastoral action for the Greek Rite population, the Habsburg Empress Maria Theresa realized that it was necessary to grant independence to the eparchy, and she obtained from Pope Pius VI its separation from the Latin Diocese of Zagreb, in a similar way as occurred in 1771 for the Eparchy of Mukacheve from the Diocese of Eger.
Accordingly, on 17 June 1777, Pope Pius VI erected the Greek Rite Eparchy of Križevci which superseded the Eparchy of Marča. Vasilije Božičković, who played a prominent role in the erection of the eparchy, was chosen as first eparch,

Many Orthodox Serbs opposed the new eparchy especially in Žumberak, particularly the metropolitan of Karlovci, Arsenije III Čarnojević. However, the Serb soldiers of the Žumberak regiment of the Military Frontier joined the Eparchy of Križevci.

Križevci, the location of the see, is a town northeast of Zagreb. The new bishop was a suffragan initially of the Archdiocese of Esztergom, and later of Zagreb, after this became a metropolitan see in 1852.

Expansion 
In 1914, the Ruthenian Catholic Apostolic Administration of Bosnia-Hercegovina was created from the Eparchy of Križevci, but in 1925, it was merged back into it, when the eparchy was expanded to include all Greek Catholics in Yugoslavia. Owing to this expansion and to population movements over time, Križevci includes Catholics of varied national heritage including:
 Croats and Serbs from Žumberak
 Rusyns in Slavonia (Croatia), Vojvodina (Serbia) and northern Bosnia who had emigrated from Carpatho-Ukraine and Slovakia
 Ukrainians who emigrated from Galicia (now in Ukraine) around 1900
 ethnic Serbs
 Macedonian converts through missionary activity in the 19th century
 a few Romanians in the Serbian Banat

Since the break-up of Yugoslavia 
Until 2001, the Eparchy of Križevci had full jurisdiction over all Eastern Catholics of the Byzantine Rite throughout the entire territory of former Yugoslavia, including all of its successor states: Croatia, Slovenia, Bosnia-Herzegovina, Serbia, Montenegro and North Macedonia. In January 2001, a separate Greek Catholic Apostolic Eparchy of Macedonia was formed for Eastern Catholics of the Byzantine Rite in Macedonia. It was fully separated from the Eparchy of Križevci and directly subjected to the Holy See.

In 2003, a new apostolic exarchate was created for Eastern Catholics of the Byzantine Rite in Serbia and Montenegro, called the Apostolic Exarchate of Serbia and Montenegro. Its first exarch Đura Džudžar was appointed in 2003, with residence in Ruski Krstur. This exarchate remained in association with the Eparchy of Križevci. After those changes, the jurisdiction of Eparchy of Križevci was reduced to Croatia, Slovenia, and Bosnia-Herzegovina.

In 2013, all Catholics of Byzantine Rite in Montenegro were entrusted to the local Latin Bishops, so the jurisdiction of the Apostolic Exarchate of Serbia and Montenegro was reduced to just Serbia, now the Eparchy of Saint Nicholas of Ruski Krstur. Since then, the Eparchy of Križevci and the Eparchy of Saint Nicholas of Ruski Krstur together constitute the Greek Catholic Church of Croatia and Serbia as a sui iuris Eastern Catholic Church of the Byzantine Rite, in full communion with the rest of the Catholic Church.

Extension 
The Eparchy reported for the year 2010 a total of 21,509 faithful in the eparchy proper (including Croatia, Slovenia, and Bosnia and Herzegovina) and 22,369 in the Apostolic Exarchate for Serbia and Montenegro.
In comparison, the most recently published census results for the Republic of Croatia, those of 2001, report only 6,219 Croatians defining themselves specifically as Greek Catholics.

A historical trend of a sharp decline in numbers, particularly in the general vicinity of Zumberak, is explained by a number of factors including emigration, particularly to the United States (including Cleveland, Chicago and Pittsburgh), and rural depopulation, particularly in the period following the second world war.

Diaspora 
The first Greek Catholic priest from Croatia came to the United States of America in 1902, whose work among Byzantine-Rite Croatians in Cleveland was encouraged by the bishop of Križevci. Another Croatian priest came to Allegheny, Pennsylvania, in 1894. Križevci is one of the four Eastern European eparchies that are the roots of the Eastern Rite Catholic Churches in the United States.

Vicariates 
The eparchy is made up of four vicariates:
 Žumberak vicariate
 Bosnian vicariate
 Slavonia-Srijem vicariate 
 Dalmatian vicariate, in Croatia

Bishops 
The list of the eparchs (bishops) of the Greek Catholic Eparchy of Križevci is:

See also 
 Eastern Christianity
 Catholic Church in Croatia
 Ruthenian Greek Catholic Church

Notes

External links 
 Križevci 

Eastern Catholic dioceses in Europe
Greek Catholic Church of Croatia and Serbia
Catholic Church in Croatia
Catholic Church in Slovenia
Catholic Church in Bosnia and Herzegovina
Religious organizations established in the 1610s
Dioceses established in the 17th century
Križevci